Football at the 1997 East Asian Games is second edition's football tournament of East Asian Games. All match was played in Busan, South Korea during May 1997.

Final table

Results
Matchday 1

Matchday 2

Matchday 3

Matchday 4

Matchday 5

Medalists

References
1997 East Asian Games - RSSSF.com

1997
1997 in Asian football
Football
1997
1997 in South Korean football
1997 in Chinese football
1997 in Japanese football
1997 in Kazakhstani football